(The Ship) is an opera in a prologue and three "episodes" by Italian composer Italo Montemezzi. It premiered at La Scala in Milan on 3 November 1918.

First performance
The opera premiered at La Scala in Milan on 3 November 1918, conducted by Tullio Serafin. La nave is a work which contains strongly patriotic and imperialistic themes, and fortune seemed to smile on its first performance when, after the conclusions of the first and second episodes, the performance was interrupted by announcements that Italian troops had entered Trento and Trieste respectively, thus signaling a successful end to Italy's involvement in World War I. A myth later developed that La nave had been a great popular and critical success in 1918. The source of this error appears to be a statement Serafin made in Opera News in 1953: "La nave was received as well as – perhaps better than – [Montemezzi's great hit] L'Amore [dei tre re]. ... it was received with warm enthusiasm by the critics of all the Milan papers" In fact, Serafin was misremembering, and none of the reviews was particularly enthusiastic. The critics praised Montemezzi's orchestral and choral writing, but criticised the opera for being insufficiently tuneful, too Germanic in style, and based on an unsuitable source. The most positive review, which appeared in the Corriere della Sera (attributed to Renato Simoni by David Chandler), described the opera as a "sincere success" with the public, but also noted that the audience response had been "only occasionally truly enthusiastic."

Later performances

Productions followed in Chicago in 1919 and Verona in 1923. It was also revived in Rome in 1938. But many factors militated against the opera's long term success. It was extremely expensive to stage, due to its large choruses, extravagant scenery, and, especially, the requirement of having a full-sized ship heading out to sea, on stage, in the final act. The lead roles are also very difficult. In addition, La nave's extremely violent and aggressively imperialistic rhetoric seemed out of place after the fall of Mussolini at the end of the Second World War.

La nave was performed in New York City by Teatro Grattacielo in concert on October 31, 2012, the first time the opera had been heard in the United States since Montemezzi conducted it in Chicago in 1919.

Roles

See also
 L'amore dei tre re, 1913 opera by Montemezzi
 L'incantesimo, 1943 opera by Montemezzi

Notes

References

Sources
  This includes (in English translation) the 1918 reviews from the Corriere della Sera, Il Secolo, Il Popolo d'Italia, La Perseveranza, Corriere di Milano and Rivista d’Italia, as well as an extended extract from the review in La Nazione.

Further reading
 Cooke, Mervyn (2005). The Cambridge Companion to Twentieth-Century Opera. Cambridge University Press. 
 Moore, Edward C. (1930). Forty Years of Opera in Chicago. H. Liveright, pp. 202–204

External links
 

Italian-language operas
Verismo operas
Operas
1918 operas
Operas by Italo Montemezzi
Operas based on plays
Opera world premieres at La Scala
Operas set in Italy
Operas based on works by Gabriele D'Annunzio